These are the United States Billboard Hot Dance Club Play and Singles Sales number-one hits of 2012.

See also
List of number-one Dance/Mix Show Airplay hits of 2012 (U.S.)
2012 in music
List of artists who reached number one on the U.S. dance chart

References

2012
United States Dance Singles
Number-one dance singles